Line 1, shortened to L1, coloured red and often simply called Línia vermella ("Red Line"), is the second oldest Barcelona Metro line, after line L3. It is the longest line of the Barcelona Metro, and links L'Hospitalet de Llobregat and Santa Coloma de Gramenet. Originally operated by the independent Ferrocarril Metropolitano Transversal de Barcelona, it is today operated by Transports Metropolitans de Barcelona (TMB) and is part of the ATM fare-integrated main transport system. L1 is the only metro line in Spain to use Iberian gauge tracks, as used by most Spanish main line railways.

The line was created in 1926 as a means to join the rail stations the city had in the 1920s, and in preparation for the 1929 Universal Exposition. It has been growing since then to become, as of 2007, a large line made up of 30 stations, the network's busiest. These stations are architecturally homogenous, and as in the case of most metro lines in Barcelona, ornamentation is virtually absent from them. Some of them are improving their artificial lighting. Most of the line is underground, except for one short section, and at one point it shares tunnels with mainline tracks.

Future plans are for the line to be extended southbound into El Prat de Llobregat and from its north terminus into Badalona, where it will join L2 in Badalona Centre.

History

1926 – Bordeta-Catalunya section opened.
1932 – Bordeta-Santa Eulàlia and Catalunya-Arc de Triomf sections opened.
1933 – Arc de Triomf-Marina section opened.
1951 – Marina-Clot section opened.
1952 – Clot-Navas section opened.
1954 – Navas-Fabra i Puig section opened.
1968 – Fabra i Puig-Torras i Bages section opened.
1983 – Torras i Bages-Santa Coloma and Santa Eulàlia-Torrassa sections opened. Bordeta station closed.
1987 – Torrassa-Avinguda Carrilet section opened. 
1989 – Avinguda Carrilet-Feixa Llarga (now Hospital de Bellvitge) section opened.
1992 – Santa Coloma-Fondo section opened.

Route

The line runs from Hospital de Bellvitge, in the municipality of L'Hospitalet de Llobregat, and Fondo, in Santa Coloma de Gramenet. Most of the line is underground, except for a short section between Plaça de Sants and Santa Eulàlia stations.

Between Catalunya and Arc de Triomf stations, L1 shares tunnels with an ADIF owned main line railway, carrying RENFE operated Rodalies de Catalunya suburban passenger services. With four tracks in the tunnels, the outer tracks carry L1 metro services whilst the middle two tracks carry main line services. At Catalunya station, the L1 metro trains stop at side platforms, whilst the Rodalies de Catalunya trains serve an island platform. At Arc de Triomf station, the Rodalies de Catalunya trains stop at side platforms, whilst the L1 trains serve platforms in flanking single track tunnels. At the intermediate Urquinaona station, the L1 metro trains stop at side platforms, whilst main line trains do not stop.

Stations
The line serves the following stations:

References

External links
 

Stations and links of this line from OpenStreetMap data
Trenscat.com

1
Railway lines opened in 1926
1672 mm gauge railways in Spain
Transport in Ciutat Vella
Transport in Eixample
Transport in Sant Andreu
Transport in Sant Martí (district)
Transport in Sants-Montjuïc
Transport in L'Hospitalet de Llobregat